Pac-12 Conference basketball championship game may refer to a game in the:
Pac-12 Conference men's basketball tournament
Pac-12 Conference women's basketball tournament